Altrier is a village in the commune of Bech, in eastern Luxembourg.  , the village had a population of 184.

Echternach (canton)
Villages in Luxembourg